The Transcaspian vole (Microtus transcaspicus) is a species of rodent in the family Cricetidae.
It is found in Afghanistan, Iran, and Turkmenistan.

References

Notes
Musser, G. G. and M. D. Carleton. 2005. Superfamily Muroidea. pp. 894–1531 in Mammal Species of the World a Taxonomic and Geographic Reference. D. E. Wilson and D. M. Reeder eds. Johns Hopkins University Press, Baltimore.

Microtus
Fauna of Iran
Mammals of Afghanistan
Mammals described in 1905
Taxa named by Konstantin Satunin
Taxonomy articles created by Polbot